The Luguru are a matrilineal  ethnic and linguistic group from Pwani Region and Morogoro Region in Tanzania. They speak the Bantu Luguru language. In 2001, the Luguru population was estimated to be at about 692,000.

References

Ethnic groups in Tanzania
Indigenous peoples of East Africa